Peripatus  is a genus of velvet worms in the Peripatidae family. The name "peripatus" (unitalicised and uncapitalised) is also used to refer to the Onychophora as a whole, although this group comprises many other genera besides Peripatus. The genus Peripatus is found in Central America, the Caribbean and northern South America. Velvet worms in this genus can have as few as 24 or 25 pairs of legs (in P. antiguensis or P. dominicae, respectively) or as many as 36 leg pairs (in P. evelinae). This genus is viviparous, with mothers supplying nourishment to their embryos through a placenta.

Species
The genus contains the following species:
 Peripatus basilensis  Brues, 1935 – Haiti
 Peripatus bouvieri Fuhrmann, 1913 – Colombia
 Peripatus brolemanni Bouvier, 1899 – Venezuela
 Peripatus danicus  Bouvier, 1900 – Virgin Islands
 Peripatus darlingtoni  Brues, 1935 – Haiti
 Peripatus dominicae Pollard, 1894 – Dominica
 Peripatus evelinae (Marcus, 1937) – Brazil
 Peripatus haitiensis  Brues, 1913 – Haiti
 Peripatus heloisae Carvalho, 1941 – Brazil
 Peripatus juanensis Bouvier, 1900 – Puerto Rico
 Peripatus juliformis Guilding, 1826 – Saint Vincent Island
 Peripatus lachauxensis  Brues, 1935 – Haiti
 Peripatus manni Brues, 1913 – Haiti
 Peripatus ruber Fuhrmann, 1913 – Costa Rica
 Peripatus sedgwicki Bouvier, 1899 – Venezuela
 Peripatus swainsonae Cockerell, 1893 – Jamaica

Peripatus antiguensis Bouvier, 1899 and Peripatus bavaysi Bouvier, 1899 are considered nomina dubia by Oliveira et al. 2012.

Former species
 Mongeperipatus solorzanoi Morera-Brenes & Monge-Nájera, 2010, Solórzano's velvet worm – Costa Rica

References

External links

 

Onychophorans of tropical America
Onychophoran genera